Saint-Privat-la-Montagne is a commune in the Moselle department in Grand Est in north-eastern France.

Saint Privat is located between the former French-German frontier as it was between 1871 and 1918 and between 1940 and 1944. It was famous at the scene of the battle of 18 August 1870 between the Germans under Prince Friedrich Karl of Prussia and the French under General Francois Certain Canrobert.

See also
 Gravelotte
 Communes of the Moselle department

References

External links
 

Saintprivatlamontagne